"We Had All the Good Things Going" is a single by American country music artist Jan Howard. Released in August 1969, the song reached #20 on the Billboard Hot Country Singles chart. The single was later included on Howard's 1970 album, Rock Me Back to Little Rock. The song was written by Jerry Monday and Mervin Shiner.

Dolly Parton also covered the song, including her version on her 1969 My Blue Ridge Mountain Boy album.

Chart performance

References 

1969 singles
Jan Howard songs
Song recordings produced by Owen Bradley
1969 songs
Decca Records singles